Brookfield Business Partners L.P. is a publicly traded limited partnership and the primary public vehicle through which Brookfield Asset Management, its parent company, owns and operates the business services and industrial operations of its private equity group. It was formed through a spin-off from Brookfield Asset Management in June 2016.

History
Its units trade on the Toronto Stock Exchange (BBU.UN) and New York Stock Exchange (BBU). Brookfield Business Partners is led by Chief Executive Officer Cyrus Madon, who joined Brookfield Asset Management in 1998, leads its global private equity group, and is a managing partner of the parent company.

In 2016, the company made its first major acquisition, agreeing to acquire a 70% stake in Brazil's largest private water and sewage company, Odebrecht Ambiental, with the remaining 30% continuing to be held by Fundo de Investimento do Fundo de Garantia do Tempo de Servico. The company was renamed BRK Ambiental.

In 2017, the company sold Maax, a bathroom fixtures maker, to American Bath for more than twice the value it acquired it for in 2008.  In the first quarter of 2017, the company announced an agreement to acquire an approximate 85% stake in Greenergy, a supplier of road fuels in the UK, and an agreement to purchase Loblaw Companies' network of gas stations (which were rebranded afterwards to Mobil under a franchise agreement with Imperial Oil).

On April 6, 2018, Toshiba completed its sale of Westinghouse Electric Company to Brookfield Asset Management, through its subsidiary, Brookfield Business Partners, and other partners.

In 2019, Brookfield Business Partners bought 45% of the company BrandSafway. BrandSafway was valued at $6.7 billion at the time of the purchase.

In October 2021, Brookfield announced that it would acquire Scientific Games' lottery division for $6.05 billion.

In April 2022, Brookfield acquired the auto dealer services company CDK Global for $6.41 billion.

References 

Brookfield Asset Management
Companies listed on the New York Stock Exchange
Companies listed on the Toronto Stock Exchange
Companies based in Toronto
Canadian companies established in 2016